Tadeusz Małolepszy (born 21 August 1952) is a Polish football coach.

Football

Małolepszy played for Lechia, making his only appearance for the club against Stal Stalowa Wola in the Polish Cup. From 2001-02 he was manager of Lechia. His footballing playing and managerial career never really took off, and he managed small, newly founded clubs; Torpedo Sopot, GKS Żukowo, and LKS Orzeł Trąbki Wielkie at different points between 2005–12.

References

1952 births
Sportspeople from Gdańsk
Sportspeople from Pomeranian Voivodeship
Polish footballers
Lechia Gdańsk players
Polish football managers
Lechia Gdańsk managers
Association footballers not categorized by position
Living people